Yass Plains was an electoral district of the Legislative Assembly in the Australian state of New South Wales between 1859 and 1894. It largely replaced the electoral district of King and Georgiana. It was largely replaced by Yass in 1894.

Members for Yass Plains

Election results

References

Former electoral districts of New South Wales
Constituencies established in 1859
1859 establishments in Australia
Constituencies disestablished in 1894
1894 disestablishments in Australia